Methanobrevibacter gottschalkii is a species of methanogen archaeon, named after Gerhard Gottschalk.

Description
It is a coccobacillus with rounded ends, about 0.7 micrometres in width and 0.9 micrometres in length, occurring in pairs or short chains. Gram-positive reaction. Its cell wall is composed of pseudomurein. It is a strict anaerobe and its type strain is HOT (=DSM 11977T =OCM 813T). It was first isolated from horse and pig faeces.

References

Further reading
Hackstein, Johannes HP, ed. (endo) symbiotic methanogenic archaea. Vol. 19. Springer, 2010.

Bignell, David Edward, Yves Roisin, and Nathan Lo, eds. Biology of termites: A modern synthesis. Springer, 2011.

External links
LPSN

Type strain of Methanobrevibacter gottschalkii at BacDive -  the Bacterial Diversity Metadatabase

Euryarchaeota
Archaea described in 2002